Chitlapakkam C. Rajendran is an Indian politician and former member of the Parliament of India from Chennai South Constituency. He represents the All India Anna Dravida Munnetra Kazhagam party.

References 

Living people
India MPs 2009–2014
All India Anna Dravida Munnetra Kazhagam politicians
Lok Sabha members from Tamil Nadu
Politicians from Chennai
Year of birth missing (living people)